The Beautiful World Tour 2007 was the sixth concert tour for the British pop group Take That.  The tour ran from 11 October to 31 December 2007, with fifty stops in ten European countries.

A band member chose a band or musician to open the concert each night, including Sophie Ellis-Bextor, who sang at all UK shows except the 31 December concert at The O2 Arena in London. That show, "Countdown to Midnight: Take That & The Sugababes", was filmed for TV and broadcast live on ITV.

Set list
 "Overture" (sung by Katherine Jenkins)
 "Reach Out"
 "It Only Takes a Minute"
 "Beautiful World"
 "Patience"
 "Hold On"
 "I'd Wait for Life"
 "Relight My Fire" (contains elements of "Vertigo" and "Crazy") (featuring Lloyd Wade) 
 "Rule the World"
 "Could It Be Magic" (Barry Manilow version) 
 "Back For Good"
 "Everything Changes"
 "Wooden Boat"
 "Give Good Feeling" (Sonic Fly remix)
 "Sure"
 "Never Forget"
 Encore
"Shine" (contains elements of "Mr. Blue Sky")  
"Pray"
"Mancunian Way"†

† "Mancunian Way" was only performed on certain dates in Manchester during the tour

Take That at Midnight set list
 "Shine"
 "Patience"
 "Auld Lang Syne" (rock version)
 "Relight My Fire" (contains elements of "Vertigo" and "Crazy") (featuring Lloyd Wade) 
 "Rule the World"
 "Could It Be Magic" (Barry Manilow version)
 "Crowd Sing-along Medley" ("Do What U Like"/"A Million Love Songs"/"Take That & Party")
 "Back for Good"
 "Never Forget"

Tour dates

Box office data

Howard Donald injury
Early performances of the tour featured a "dance-off" routine by band members in the middle of the song "Sure". Band member Howard Donald suffered a cracked rib and a collapsed lung during this part of the 26 October show in Vienna.  His injuries caused him to miss seven shows and limited his performance in subsequent concerts. He rejoined the band at the 7 November Oberhausen show. Following Donald's injury, the dance off segment was subsequently removed from the show.

DVD release
The O2 Arena shows on 6 and 7 December 2007 were recorded. They were released on 25 February 2008 on a limited edition two-disc DVD set, Beautiful World Live, containing behind-the-scenes footage.  A Blu-ray version was also released in 2008.

References

2007 concert tours
Take That concert tours